This is the discography of Scottish band The Fratellis. They have released 6 studio albums, 4 EPs, and 17 singles since their breakthrough in 2006. They won in the category Best British Breakthrough Act at the 2007 BRIT Awards.

Studio albums

EPs 

Notes

A  The Fratellis EP was ineligible for the UK Charts due to the fact the EP was limited in numbers and contained stickers.
B  The Ole Black 'n' Blue Eyes EP vinyl released contained stickers, making it ineligible for the UK charts, so it charted on the strength of digital downloads alone.

Singles

Other releases

B-sides

Miscellaneous 
 "Chelsea Dagger" appeared on Ginger and The Vegesaurs.
 "Whistle for the Choir" appears on Spongo, Fuzz & Jalapena.
 The songs "Solid Gold Easy Action" and "Baby Fratelli" were featured on the soundtrack to the film Hot Fuzz.
 The Fratellis' cover of "Stir It Up", originally by Bob Marley, appears on the album Island 50: 50 Years of Island Records.
 The Fratellis' cover of "All Along the Watchtower", originally by Bob Dylan, appears on the album Radio 1: Established 1967.

DVD releases 
Edgy in Brixton

A live DVD recorded at the Brixton Academy in London, it was released on 1 October 2007. The performance features all songs from Costello Music along with some B-sides and Ooh La Hot Love, a cover of Goldfrapp's "Ooh La La" and T.Rex's "Hot Love".

Here We Stand
The deluxe version of the album, released in December 2008 features a bonus DVD containing Live from Abbey Road performances, a documentary entitled The Year of the Thief, footage of the entire concert from The Filmore, San Francisco, and music videos for "Mistress Mabel" and "Look Out Sunshine!".

Music videos

Notes

References 

Discographies of British artists
Rock music group discographies